Mike Kelley (born December 31, 1959) is a former professional quarterback. He played for the Tampa Bay Bandits and Memphis Showboats in the United States Football League. After the USFL failed, he joined the San Diego Chargers of the National Football League as a replacement player during the 1987 strike. Eight years after his stint with the Chargers, he came out of retirement at age 35 to serve as backup quarterback on the Memphis Mad Dogs, a Canadian Football League team. He played collegiately for the Georgia Tech football team. He was inducted into the Georgia Tech Hall of Fame in 1992.

See also 

 List of Georgia Tech Yellow Jackets starting quarterbacks
 Georgia Tech Yellow Jackets football statistical leaders

References

Living people
1959 births
American football quarterbacks
Georgia Tech Yellow Jackets football players
Memphis Showboats players
San Diego Chargers players
Tampa Bay Bandits players
National Football League replacement players
People from Sonora, California
Players of American football from California